The bride of Christ or the lamb's wife is a term used in reference to a group of related verses in the Bible, in the Gospels, Revelation, the Epistles and related verses in the Old Testament. Sometimes, the bride is implied by calling Jesus a bridegroom. For over 1500 years, the Church was identified as the bride betrothed to Christ. However, there are instances of the interpretation of the usage varying from church to church. Most believe that it always refers to the church.

Christ as a bridegroom 
In the Gospel of John, John the Baptist speaks of Jesus Christ as the bridegroom and mentions the bride.

That is the only place in the Gospels that the bride is mentioned, but because a bridegroom must have a bride, all other mentions of the bridegroom imply the bride.

In the Gospels, when Jesus is asked why his disciples do not fast, but the followers of John and the Pharisees do, Jesus answers: 

The Bridegroom is also mentioned in the Parable of the Ten Virgins.

Mentions of the bride 
The Book of Revelation repeatedly mentions the appearance of the Bride.

Note - The Greek word for bride is νύμφη (nymfi or numphe) as in Revelation 21:2, 9, (cf., 18:23; 22:17). This word, νύμφη , is understood to mean "a son's wife," or "daughter-in-law," -"bride." Revelation 19:7 which has γυνὴ (gune) means "wife" or "woman". The context of Revelation 19:7 is marriage so this should inform the reader why numerous Bible translations are consistent with the Greek in translating γυνὴ as "bride". The text provides the context coupled with an understanding of the culture. She is a betrothed "woman" getting married - a bride. Bride is the word chosen in translations such as NIV, NLT, ESV, NASB, ISV etc.,

Comparing church to a bride 

In , Paul compares the union of husband and wife to that of Christ and the church. The central theme of the whole Ephesians letter is reconciliation of the alienated within the unity of the church. Ephesians 5 begins by calling on Christians to imitate God and Christ, who gave himself up for them with love.  contains a rather strong warning against foolishness and letting down one's guard against evil. Rather, the author encourages the readers to constantly give thanks with song in their hearts because of what God has done for all in Christ. That prelude to the subject's text takes up again the theme of loving submission that began with the example of Christ in : "Be submissive to one another out of reverence for Christ." It implies that the "Bride" is the body of believers that comprise the universal Christian Ekklēsia (Church) (lit. "called-out ones").

The ekklēsia is never explicitly called "the bride of Christ" in the New Testament. A major analogy is that of the body. Just as husband and wife are to be "one flesh", this analogy for the writer describes the relationship of Christ and ekklēsia. Husbands were exhorted to love their wives "just as Christ loved the ekklēsia and gave himself for it. When Christ nourishes and cherishes the ekklēsia, he nourishes and cherishes his own flesh. Just as the husband, when he loves his wife is loving his own flesh. Members of the ekklēsia are "members of his own body" because it is written in  "and the two shall become one flesh". In  Paul quotes the Genesis passage as what has been called a "divine postscript".

In writing to the Church of Corinth in 2 Corinthians 11 Paul writes to warn the community of false teachers who would teach of another Christ, and to confess his concern that they will believe someone who teaches a false Christ, other than Christ Jesus of Nazareth whom he preached; Paul referred to the Church in Corinth as being espoused to Christ. "For I am jealous over you with godly jealousy: for I have espoused you to one husband, that I may present you as a chaste virgin to Christ. But I fear, lest by any means, as the serpent beguiled Eve through his subtlety, so your minds should be corrupted from the simplicity that is in Christ. For if he that cometh preacheth another Jesus, whom we have not preached, or if ye receive another spirit, which ye have not received, or another gospel, which ye have not accepted, ye might well bear with him".

In the writing to the Church in Rome, Paul writes, "Wherefore, my brethren, ye also are become dead to the law by the body of Christ; that ye should be married to another, even to him who is raised from the dead, that we should bring forth fruit unto God" (emphasis added).[Romans 7] Here, Paul seems to suggest that the Church is to be married to Jesus Christ of Nazareth, who was raised from the dead.

Other interpretations

Nuns as brides of Christ
While the most commonly accepted interpretation of the bride of Christ is the Church, there are other, uncommon interpretations. A possible alternate interpretation is to regard nuns as being brides of Christ, with their taking monastic vows regarded as a "marriage" to Christ and their keeping their vows – as being faithful to that Divine husband. A notable promoter of that interpretation was Gertrude the Great, a highly influential Christian mystic of the 13th century. It is known that, together with her friend and teacher Mechtilde, Gertrude practiced a spirituality called "nuptial mysticism", and came to see herself as the Bride of Christ.

St. Bernard of Clairvaux
St. Bernard of Clairvaux, in his sermons on the Song of Songs, interprets the bride of Christ as the soul and the union thereof as the mystical union of the soul with Christ.

Old Testament
The earliest Christian tradition identifies texts from the Hebrew Bible as symbolic of the divine love of God and people. The love poems of the Song of Songs and the latter prophet Hosea have many references to an intimate, spousal relationship between God and his people. The prophet Hosea notes his bride in chapter 2, verses 16 and following. The theme of bridal love is central in the dramatic marriage of Hosea (Hosea 1:2).

See also 
 Bridal theology
 Parable of the Ten Virgins
 Consecrated virgin
 Ecce homo in Eastern Orthodoxy

Notes 

Polygamy
Biblical phrases
Christian terminology
Ecclesiology
Jesus in Christianity
Women in the New Testament
Marriage in Christianity
Gender in the Bible

External links
Christian article on who the "Bride of Christ" is